Ankkarock was a Finnish rock and metal festival held annually in Korso, Vantaa, in the Greater Helsinki area. It literally translates into Duckrock. The first Ankkarock was held in 1987. The festival was free of charge until 1998.

In 2006 the two-day event attracted approximately 40,000 visitors. The 2007 festival took place on 4–5 August. The final event was in 2010.

Lineups

2009
Held on 1 August and 2 August.

August 1
Cavalera Conspiracy
Turbonegro
New York Dolls
DragonForce
Tehosekoitin
Hardcore Superstar
Maija Vilkkumaa
Egotrippi
Ensiferum
Stamina
Tuomo 
CMX
Scandinavian Music Group
Ankanpoikarock-voittajat

August 2
Sonata Arctica
Volbeat
TV on the Radio
The National
Eppu Normaali
Amon Amarth
Testament
Fucked Up
Amorphis
Apulanta
Kotiteollisuus
Le Corps mince de Francoise
Pintandwefall 
PMMP
Turisas
Ankanpoikarock-voittajat

2008
Held on 2 August and 3 August

August 2
Hanoi Rocks
Tiger Army
Kent
The Hives
HIM

August 3
Apulanta
Volbeat
Soilwork
Apocalyptica
Opeth

2007
Held on 4 August and 5 August.

August 4
The Sounds
The Gathering
Leningrad
Apulanta
Zen Café
Hanoi Rocks
Maija Vilkkumaa
Von Hertzen Brothers
Rubik 
Maj Karma
Poisonblack

August 5
Dir en grey
The Ark
Millencolin
Mando Diao
The 69 Eyes
Disco Ensemble
PMMP
Lapko
Amorphis
Sonata Arctica 
Poets of the Fall
Damn Seagulls
Nine Inch Nails

2006
Held on 5 August and 6 August.

August 5
Dropkick Murphys
Opeth
Danko Jones
Amorphis
CKY featuring Bam Margera
Disco Ensemble
a diet.
PMMP
Hanoi Rocks
Apulanta
Don Johnson Big Band 
Sonata Arctica
Timo Rautiainen
Mokoma 
Eläkeläiset 
Lemonator 
Mirror of Madness
Ankanpoikarock-voittajat

August 6
Ministry
Turbonegro
Children of Bodom
Backyard Babies
Flogging Molly
The Rasmus
Egotrippi
Lapko
Tiktak
Poets of the Fall
Scandinavian Music Group
Teräsbetoni
Maija Vilkkumaa 
No Shame
Von Hertzen Brothers
Ankanpoikarock-voittajat

Lineups from pre-2006 include such artists as:
Juliette & The Licks
The Soundtrack Of Our Lives
The Posies
Franz Ferdinand
The Cardigans
The Darkness
The Hellacopters
HIM
Scorpions
Motörhead
Nightwish
Uriah Heep

References

External links

Official website

Heavy metal festivals in Finland
Rock festivals in Finland
Music festivals established in 1989
Recurring events disestablished in 2010
Vantaa
Summer events in Finland